Patricia Fahy is an American politician and a member of the Democratic Party, who currently represents parts of Albany County in the New York State Assembly, including most of western Albany. She was previously president of the Albany City Board of Education.

Electoral history

2012 elections
On September 13, 2012, there was a primary election in the Democratic Party to replace the retiring incumbent Jack McEneny, who had been an assemblyman for 20 years. Fahy received 5,335 votes (36.34%) in a crowded field that included Frank J. Commisso, Jr., Christopher T. Higgins, William J. McCarthy, Jr., Jim Coyne and Margarita Perez, as well as write-in candidates. Ted J. Danz, Jr., however, beat Fahy in the Independence Party primary held the same date, 51 to 46%, with some write-ins. Her opponents were all politically well-connected: Commisso, Jr. was a sitting member of the Albany Common Council; Higgins was a sitting member of the Albany County Legislature; McCarthy was an attorney and scion of a well-known family of the area; Perez was a notable local political activist; businessman Danz had been active in local Republican politics for decades.

In the November 2012 general election, Fahy won with 37,967 votes, or almost 63%, on the Democratic and Working Family party lines, against Danz, who received about 32.5% on the Republican and Independence lines, and the perennial candidate and Tea Party activist Joseph P. Sullivan on the Conservative line, who got about 3.5% of the vote.

Legislative work

Fahy fought Governor Andrew Cuomo's proposed 2014-2015 education budget.

She praised Cuomo's environmental efforts, but questioned the timing of delays to environmental review.

In February 2017, Fahy, along with Albany mayor Kathy Sheehan and congressman Paul Tonko, were criticized by Bishop Edward Scharfenberger for being Catholic politicians who supported and attended a rally for Planned Parenthood.

References

External links
 Official biography at the New York State Assembly website
 Biography at Election campaign website
 Facebook page
 LinkedIn page
 OpenStates page

Year of birth missing (living people)
Living people
Democratic Party members of the New York State Assembly
Women state legislators in New York (state)
Politicians from Albany, New York
Northern Illinois University alumni
21st-century American politicians
21st-century American women politicians